The 2014–15 season was the 75th season of competitive association football since joining Southern Football League in 1935 and the 16th season in the Football League played by Cheltenham Town Football Club, a professional football club based in Cheltenham, Gloucestershire. Following relegation from League One in 2008–09 season it was the 6th consecutive season in League Two.

Mark Yates started his fifth full season as the club manager. The summer transfer window saw eight players join the club, while eight players including veteran striker Jamie Cureton and long-served first-choice goalkeeper Scott Brown left the club.

Cheltenham Town started the season brightly, going top of the league after a draw at Morecambe on 6 September. The Robins won five games of eight in all competitions, losing only League Cup tie to Championship side Brighton & Hove Albion.

However, during September club's form deteriorated as Cheltenham failed to win a match till 18 October. On 25 November, following fourth straight league defeat, club have parted company with Yates, with immediate effect. The next day ex-Luton Town manager Paul Buckle was appointed as his replacement on a one-year contract.

The managerial change did not affect the results as the Robins lost to Conference National side Dover Athletic in the FA Cup and continued to struggle in the league. On 13 February another losing streak saw Buckle leave Cheltenham on mutual consent after only one victory in 13 games. Head of Academy Coaching Russell Milton took charge as a caretaker manager.

On 30 March with the club bottom of the table Milton stepped down to an assistant role after ex-Yeovil Town manager Gary Johnson was appointed with seven games until the end of the season. As both of his predecessors, Johnson managed to win only one game and following the home defeat against Shrewsbury Town on a penultimate day of the season Cheltenham Town were relegated to the National League.

Despite poor performances, on 29 April it was announced that Gary Johnson signed two-year contract with Cheltenham Town aiming to an immediate return to the Football League.

Background and pre-season

Pre-season matches

Review

August

League Two

League table

Results by matchday

Matches
The fixtures for the 2014–15 season were announced on 18 June 2014 at 9am.

FA Cup

The draw for the first round of the FA Cup was made on 27 October 2014.

League Cup

Football League Trophy

Players

First team squad
Only players participated in official matches are listed.
Players sorted by numbers, players joined during the season sorted by the time they joined the team.

Transfers
Transfers are listed from the last day of the previous season till the final day of this season

Contract extensions

Loans

Squad statistics
Source:

Numbers in parentheses denote appearances as substitute.
Players with squad numbers struck through and marked  left the club during the playing season.
Players with names in italics and marked * were on loan from another club for the whole of their season with Cheltenham.
Players listed with no appearances have been in the matchday squad but only as unused substitutes.
Key to positions: GK – Goalkeeper; DF – Defender; MF – Midfielder; FW – Forward

References

Cheltenham Town
Cheltenham Town F.C. seasons